Monte Cornacchia may refer to the following mountains in Italy:

Monte Cornacchia (Abruzzi Apennines), mountain of the Abruzzi Apennines
Monte Cornacchia (Daunian Mountains), the highest peak in the Daunian Mountains